"Freedom" is a song by Solange included on the soundtrack of the 2004 comedy film Johnson Family Vacation.

History
Solange and her producers at Music World, the record label of Beyoncé Knowles and Destiny's Child, selected a track by Houston jazz-funk band Drop Trio for a new song by then-rising star Solange Knowles. Solange, who released her first album Solo Star in 2003, saw Drop Trio performing at a local club in Houston and suggested co-writing a song. The result is "Freedom", with lyrics and melody by Solange and instrumental track composed, produced and recorded by Drop Trio.

The song was used on the soundtrack for the 2004 released feature film, Johnson Family Vacation, which opened on April 7, 2004 and stars Solange, Cedric the Entertainer, Vanessa Williams, Steve Harvey, and Bow Wow, among others. The soundtrack also features songs by Ashanti, Patti Labelle, and Barry White.

External links
 Solange Official Website
 Drop Trio Official Website
Johnson Family Vacation – Official site

Solange Knowles songs
2004 songs
Songs written by Solange Knowles